Anemadini is a tribe of small carrion beetles in the family Leiodidae. There are at least 30 genera and more than 70 described species in Anemadini.

Genera
These 30 genera belong to the tribe Anemadini:

 Anemadiola Szymczakowski, 1963
 Anemadus Reitter, 1884
 Araucaniopsis Salgado Costas, 2005
 Austrocholeva Zwick, 1979
 Austronargus Zwick, 1979
 Austronemadus Zwick, 1979
 Catoposchema Jeannel, 1936
 Cholevodes Portevin, 1928
 Dissochaetus Reitter, 1884
 Eocatops Peyerimhoff, 1924
 Eunemadus Portevin, 1914
 Falkocholeva Hatch, 1928
 Falkonemadus Szymczakowski, 1961
 Mesocolon Broun, 1880
 Micronemadus Jeannel, 1936
 Nargiotes Jeannel, 1936
 Nargomorphus Jeannel, 1936
 Nemadiolus Jeannel, 1936
 Nemadiopsis Jeannel, 1936
 Nemadotropis Szymczakowski, 1971
 Nemadus Thomson, 1867
 Neoeocatops Peck & Cook, 2007
 Newtoniopsis Salgado Costas, 2005
 Paracatops Portevin, 1907
 Paranemadus Zwick, 1979
 Peckardia Salgado Costas, 2005
 Pseudonargiotes Salgado Costas, 2005
 Pseudonemadus Portevin, 1914
 Rangiola Jeannel, 1936
 Speonemadus Jeannel, 1922

References

Further reading

External links

 
 

Leiodidae